Nanophyes is a genus of beetles belonging to the family Brentidae.

The species of this genus are found in Europe, Japan and Southern Africa.

Species:
 Nanophyes brevis Boheman, 1845 
 Nanophyes chibizo Kono, 1930 
 Nanophyes globiformis (Kiesenwetter, 1864) 
 Nanophyes poecilopterus H.Brisout, 1869 
 Nanophyes rubricus Rosenhauer, 1856 
 Nanophyes transfuga Fairmaire, 1897

References

Brentidae